Lasswade High School is a non-denominational secondary state school in Bonnyrigg, Midlothian, Scotland.

History
A parish school was first established in the village of Lasswade in 1615, run by the schoolmaster, Andrew Watson, from a cottage at the mouth of the Spout Burn. Over the following two-and-a-half centuries the school was administered with assistance from the kirk session. One of the most notable schoolmasters during this period was the poet and scholar William Tennant, who was appointed in 1816 and subsequently became Professor of Oriental Languages at the University of St Andrews. In the 1860s and 1870s, under the aegis of Robert Marshall, the school acquired a reputation for excellence as a higher-grade school, at a time when elementary education was made compulsory for all children between the ages of 5 to 13.

From this era onwards, the school frequently sought to cater for increasing pupil numbers by building new accommodation. In 1843 a two-room schoolhouse was opened, which the New Statistical Account of Scotland described as "a spacious and elegant building" where Latin, Greek, French and mathematics were taught (albeit at a fee that was "very considerable in amount"). Nearly forty years later, in 1881, the school moved premises to a much larger building at the top of School Brae, where the secondary-level pupils were now instructed separately from the younger cohorts. In 1956, Lasswade Senior Secondary School (as it was now known) transferred to yet another new building, this time located in the nearby town of Bonnyrigg, with improvements and extensions opened in 1978 to provide classrooms for the Business Studies, Home Economics, Music, Art & Design, Science and Craft, Design & Technology departments, as well as a Library, Computer Room, Kitchen, Dining Room and Sports Centre. Lasswade was further developed as a community school in 1979, and a new Mathematics and Support wing was formally opened by the Education Minister, Jack McConnell, in 2000.

In 2009 it was announced that a new Lasswade High School Community Campus was to be built, with construction beginning in October 2011 on the site of the old school's playing fields. The school re-opened in 2013 as the Lasswade Centre, with ceremonial duties performed by the then First Minister of Scotland, Alex Salmond. The new building cost £38 million to complete, and contains 90 classrooms to accommodate around 1,500 pupils. The facility also has a purpose-built Sports Centre, which comprises a games hall, squash courts, fitness training rooms, activity movement studio, cafeteria, creche and spacious playing fields.

Fittest School in Britain 2009
The school took the top prize in the Fitter Schools Challenge, in which 3,000 UK schools put their sporting prowess to the test. The school was presented with a trophy and £10,000 worth of sports equipment by Olympian Roger Black. The challenge was open to first and second year pupils at every school in the UK. Each school had to complete in three challenges which tested their skills and stamina. Pupils were asked to complete a shuttle run, which tested their ability to accelerate and change direction. They were also challenged to see how many star jumps they could do in a minute.

Links with China and South Africa
In recent years, the school has developed educational links with Tianlin No 3 Middle School in Shanghai, People's Republic of China. The collaboration is part of a wider initiative to develop a closer relationship between Scotland and China, and will include teacher and pupil exchanges as well as using e-mail and the internet to develop joint projects.

Eco-Schools
Following a visit by an Eco-Schools inspection team in 2008, Lasswade High was awarded the Green Flag environmental award.

Notable former pupils

James Edward Tierney Aitchison (1835–1898), surgeon and botanist
A. J. Aitken (1921–1998), lexicographer; scholar of the Scots language.
Christopher Anderson (1782–1852), theologian.
Paul Frederick de Quincey (1828–1894), soldier and politician in New Zealand; son of Thomas De Quincey
Sean Fraser (born 1990), swimmer and bronze medallist at the 2008 Summer Paralympics in Beijing.
Sir James Arnot Hamilton (1923–2012), aircraft designer; Director-General of the Concorde aviation project for the Ministry of Technology (1966–1970).
Gary Locke (born 1975), professional footballer.
Canon Stewart Mallin (1924–2000), Episcopalian cleric, Dean of Moray, Ross and Caithness (1983–1991). 
Gary Mason (born 1979), professional footballer.
Brian McCabe (born 1951), author and poet, editor of the Edinburgh Review (2004–2011).
Paul F. McMillan (1956–2022), Sir William Ramsay Professor of Chemistry, University College London (2008–2022).
Gary Naysmith (born 1978), professional footballer.
David Pryde (1890–1959), Labour MP, 1945–1959.
Graeme Randall (born 1975), former World Judo champion (1999).
Pat Semple (1939–2021), landscape artist.
Richard Baird Smith (1818–1861), army officer in the East India Company; chief engineer at the Siege of Delhi in 1857.
Craig Thomson (born 1991), professional footballer.
Albert Watson (born 1942), fashion photographer.
Steven Whittaker (born 1984), professional footballer.
Peter Wright (born 1967), former rugby union international.

References

External links
 Midlothian Council website
 School website
 Lasswade's page on Scottish Schools Online

Secondary schools in Midlothian
Educational institutions established in the 1610s
1610s establishments in Scotland
School buildings completed in 2013
Bonnyrigg and Lasswade